Floral design or flower arrangement is the art of using plant materials and flowers to create an eye-catching and balanced composition or display. Evidence of refined floristry is found as far back as the culture of ancient Egypt. Professionally designed floral designs, arrangements or artwork incorporate the elements of floral design: line, form, space, texture, and color, and the principles of floral design: balance, proportion, rhythm, contrast, harmony, and unity.

There are many styles of floral design including Botanical Style, Garden Style (Hand Tied, Compote or Armature), Crescent Corsage, Nosegay Corsage, Pot au Fleur, Inverted "T", Parallel Systems, Western Line, Hedgerow Design, Mille de Fleur, and Formal Linear.

The Eastern, Western, and European styles have all influenced the commercial floral industry as it is today. Ikebana is a Japanese style of floral design, and incorporates the three main line placements of heaven, human, and earth. In contrast, the European style emphasizes color and variety of botanical materials not limited to just blooming flowers, in mass gatherings of multiple flowers. Western design historically is characterized by symmetrical, asymmetrical, horizontal, and vertical style of arrangements.

In addition to flower arrangements, floral design includes making wreaths, nosegays, garlands, festoons, boutonnieres, corsages, and bows.

Dried arrangements and related media 
Permanent creations and components incorporating dried materials such as bark, wood, dried flowers, dried (and often aromatic) inflorescences, leaves, leaf skeletons, preserved materials and artefacts, are common extensions of the art floral design, and are of practical importance in that they last indefinitely and are independent of the seasons. Their materials offer effects, idioms, and associations complementary to, and contrasting with, fresh flowers and foliage.

Schools 
With the ever-growing interest in the natural world and flowers, the floral industry continues to grow.  The increase in educational institutes providing training in floral design has expanded to many state universities as well as certified design schools worldwide.

Associations 
Prominent industry associations that promote floral design worldwide include the American Institute of Floral Designers (AIFD), the Society of American Florists (SAF), and the National Association of Flower Arranging Societies (NAFAS). These and other associations promote floral design through workshops, conferences, flower shows, and seminars.

Designers

Notable floral designers include Daniel Ost, Junichi Kakizaki, Paula Pryke, Phil Rulloda, Catherine Conlin, Constance Spry, Jennifer McGarigle, Judith Blacklock, Stanlee Gatti, Irene Hayes, Julia Clements, Azuma Makoto, and the White House Chief Floral Designer.

See also
Floristry
History of flower arrangement
Ikebana
Floral Jamming

References

Design
Floristry
Arts occupations